Likoma may refer to:

Likoma (moth), a genus of moths in the family Sphingidae
Likoma Island, an island surrounded by Lake Malawi in East Africa
Likoma District, an administrative district of Malawi
Likoma, Malawi, a town on Likoma Island that serves as the administrative capital of Likoma District